John Tagliaferri (born April 13, 1964) is a former professional American football running back who played in the National Football League. In 1987 he played professionally briefly in the Italian Football League, before signing and playing with the Miami Dolphins in the 1987 strike season.  He played college football at Cornell.

College career
Tagliaferri played four seasons for the Cornell Big Red, playing on special teams and as a reserve running back for three years and starting at fullback as a senior. In his final season, he led Cornell in rushing with 583 yards on 155 carries and in receiving with 61 receptions for 358 yards and also led the team with eight total touchdowns and was named second-team All-Ivy League. Tagliaferri left Cornell as the schools leader for receptions in a career (99), in a season (61) and in a game (15).

Professional career
Tagliaferri was signed by the Miami Dolphins as an undrafted free agent in 1986 but was cut during the preseason. He then played football professionally in Italy.  After he began working as an investment banker for Lord Abbett until he was re-signed by the Dolphins in October 1987 as a replacement player during the 1987 NFL players strike. In three games, Tagliaferri rushed 13 times for 45 yards and one touchdown and led all of the replacement Dolphins with 12 receptions and 117 receiving yards. He was released by the Dolphins on November 2, 1987, after the strike ended.

References

External links
Cornell Big Red profile

1964 births
American football running backs
Cornell Big Red football players
Miami Dolphins players
Players of American football from New Jersey
Living people
People from West Windsor, New Jersey
National Football League replacement players
American expatriate players of American football
American expatriate sportspeople in Italy